Thin Man Press is a London-based boutique publisher.

In July 2014, Thin Man Press published Libertines' front man Peter Doherty's second book From Albion to Shangri-La. It is a compilation of extracts from Doherty's journals and tour diaries, edited by Nina Antonia.

In 2012, Thin Man Press published an English translation of Osama bin Laden's bodyguard's memoir: Guarding Bin Laden, My Life in Al-Qaeda by Nasser al-Bahri, originally published in France, co-written by Le Figaro journalist, Georges Malbrunot.

Thin Man Press has also published, among other titles: Spark In The Dark, the first collection of poetry by Southwark Mysteries playwright, John Constable (aka John Crow); The Rise and Fall of The Clash an account of tracking down the various members of The Clash and then making the eponymous film, by director, Danny Garcia; A Wave of Dreams, the surrealist classic by Louis Aragon in translation for the first time by Susan de Muth and Licentia by A.A. Walker.

References

Companies based in the London Borough of Southwark
Publishing companies of the United Kingdom